The 1911 Calgary municipal election was held on December 11, 1911 to elect a Mayor and twelve Aldermen to sit on the twenty-eighth Calgary City Council from January 2, 1912 to January 2, 1913.

Background
The election was held under multiple non-transferable vote where each elector was able to cast a ballot for the mayor and up to three ballots for separate councillors with a voter's designated ward. Mayor John William Mitchell and Commissioner Simon John Clarke was acclaimed as the only candidate for Mayor on December 4, 1911.

Results

Mayor
John William Mitchell - Acclaimed

Commissioner
 Arthur Garnet Graves - Acclaimed

Councillors

Ward 1

Ward 2

Ward 3

Ward 4

School board trustee

Public School Board

Separate School Board

See also
List of Calgary municipal elections

References

Municipal elections in Calgary
1911 elections in Canada
1910s in Calgary